Debabrata Saikia (Assamese: দেবব্ৰত শইকীয়া; born 14 December 1964) is an Indian politician serving as the Leader of Opposition in the Assam Legislative Assembly since 2016. He represents the Nazira constituency in the Assam Legislative Assembly since 2011.He is the son of former Chief Minister of Assam, Hiteswar Saikia and former minister in the Government of Assam, Hemoprova Saikia.

Early and personal life
Saikia was born on 14 December 1964, at Nazira, Sivasagar, Assam. He is the son of former Chief Minister of Assam, Hiteswar Saikia and former minister Hemoprova Saikia. Sri Saikia had completed his graduation in Arts from Calcutta University. He married Smti Bandana Saikia. Saikia and his wife have two children, Luit and Krishnika.

Political career
Sri Saikia became the General Secretary of Assam Pradesh Youth Congress Committee in the year 1992–93 and the Self-Employed Review Committee formed by Assam Pradesh Youth Congress in 1992–93. He had been the Vice President of Assam Pradesh Youth Congress from 1993 to 1996. He had been appointed as State Convener of Bichar Bibhag by the All India Congress Committee in 1994. He also served as a Convener, North East Congress Seva Dal in 1995–96. 

He became the Indian National Congress candidate for Nazira in the 2011 Assam Legislative Assembly Election. He received  52510 votes, 63.4% of the total vote. He defeated the incumbent Communist Party MLA, Drupad Borgohain, by 33810 votes.

In the 2016 Assam Legislative assembly election, Debabrata Saikia was able to retain his seat comfortably as an MLA from Nazira Constituency after a big storm of PARIBARTAN created by BJP. He received 52869 votes, 53.77% of the total vote. He defeated his nearest opponent by 14855 votes. Although the Congress Party lost the election due to a huge anti-incumbent backlash, Mr. Saikia had emerged as a big leader within the party and as well as in Assam politics after his big win in his own constituency. As almost all the senior leader had been defeated in their own constituency (except Tarun Gogoi, Ajanta Neog & Rakibul Hussain), Mr. Saikia had the most probable chance to become the leader of the opposition. After that defeat, a voice of changing the leaders within the Congress Party was strongly raised. To maintain the unity within the party and giving importance of his capability of hardworking and dedication, the party high command made him the Leader of Opposition of Assam Legislative Assembly. He was relatively young and was acceptable to most of the 26 Congress MLAs who managed to win. Saikia's appointment came into effect on 3 June 2016.

According to a popular blog platform DailyO from the India Today Group, Debabrata Saikia is the smartest choice for Congress in Assam, because of his low profile and measured visibility has managed to keep him politically fresh in the public psyche.

In the 2021 Assam Legislative Assembly election, Saikia received 52387 votes., 47.56% of the total vote. He narrowly retained his seat by 683 votes.

Saikia lost the position of Leader of the Opposition in the Assembly. The change came into effect on 1 January 2021. This happened after Ajanta Neog and Rajdeep Gowala joined BJP and 2 other congress MLAs - Tarun Gogoi and Pranab Gogoi died. This reduced the number of congress MLAs from 24 to 20, one less than the required number of 21. However he was reinstated after he appealed to Guwahati High Court.

Social Activities
Shri Saikia set up Swarna Jayanti Children's Park at Charaideo for children for education through entertainment on 30 January 2009. With a motto to "Bring SMILE" in association with YSW (Youth for Social Welfare) Saikia conducted Free Plastic Surgery Camps jointly with Interplast Germany, a global humanitarian organization. More than 500 children and poor patients to date were treated for cleft lips, cleft palate, burn contractures, etc. since 1994. Presently, the Assam Government has made the "Smile project" a major government project. He also conducts some free distribution programs of items of necessity to people below the poverty line in many minority and tea-belt areas. In his early days, before entering politics, he used to conduct awareness programs for various self-help groups for their development and operations. Currently, Mr. Saikia has launched a new initiative called JAGARON (www.jagaron.in) to connect the people from all over the state and to listen to their day-to-day problems. Through this initiative, he is also trying to portray the issues of every household directly to the Government from the bench of the Leader of the opposition. In this initiative, he also keeps space for the youth who want to learn about digital media and campaign support.

References 

1964 births
Living people
Members of the Assam Legislative Assembly
Indian National Congress politicians from Assam
Assam MLAs 2016–2021
Leaders of the Opposition in Assam
People from Sivasagar district
Assam MLAs 2011–2016